Nay Win Ate Tan Tat, is a 2017 Burmese drama film starring Pyay Ti Oo, Paing Phyo Thu and Htun Eaindra Bo. The film, produced by Victoria Film Production, premiered in Myanmar on June 2, 2017.

Cast
Pyay Ti Oo as Dr. Myat Htun
Paing Phyo Thu as May Kyar Phyu
Htun Eaindra Bo as Daw Thit Sar
Ye Mon as Dr. Min Khant

References

2017 films
2010s Burmese-language films
Burmese drama films
Films shot in Myanmar
Films directed by Wyne
2017 drama films